U.S. Route 30 (US 30) is the portion of an east–west highway that travels across the state of West Virginia along what was previously WV 79.

Route description
US 30 in West Virginia starts off at the corner of the Ohio River, where it immediately runs into Chester. The freeway portion that was carried over from Ohio ends shortly after. After an intersection with WV 8, US 30 continues into Pennsylvania. This segment of US 30 is the shortest.

History

Junction list

References

External links

 West Virginia
30
Transportation in Hancock County, West Virginia
Lincoln Highway